A.K. Md. Yusuf was a Member of the 3rd National Assembly of Pakistan as a representative of East Pakistan.

Career
Yusuf was a Member of the 3rd National Assembly of Pakistan representing Bakerganj-cum-Khulna.

References

Pakistani MNAs 1962–1965
Living people
Year of birth missing (living people)